Carrizo Gorge is a valley in the Jacumba Mountains, in San Diego County, California.

References

External links
Carrizo Gorge Wilderness - BLM

Valleys of San Diego County, California